Xtra Magazine (formerly DailyXtra  and Xtra!) is an LGBTQ-focused digital publication and former print newspaper published by Pink Triangle Press in Toronto, Ontario, Canada. The publication is a continuation of the company's former print titles Xtra!, Xtra Ottawa, and Xtra Vancouver, which were all discontinued in 2015.

History 
Xtra was founded in Toronto on February 19, 1984 (with a March cover date) by Pink Triangle Press, a not-for-profit organization. It was introduced as a four-page tabloid, as a way to broaden PTP's Toronto readership. Pink Triangle Press had previously published The Body Politic. From 1990 to 2000, Xtra published a quarterly literary supplement, The Church-Wellesley Review, for work by LGBTQ2 fiction and poetry writers.

In 1993, Xtra expanded, adding Xtra! West in Vancouver and Capital Xtra! in Ottawa. The three Xtra papers also produced an annual Ultimate Pride Guide and an annual lesbian and gay business directory called Index. Xtra and Xtra! West were published biweekly, while Capital Xtra! was initially published as a monthly with its publication frequency later expanding to every three weeks.

The Vancouver and Ottawa publications were renamed Xtra Vancouver and Xtra Ottawa in the late 2000s, while the Toronto edition retained the name Xtra.

The final print issues of Xtra Vancouver and Xtra Ottawa appeared on February 12, 2015, while the Toronto edition's final print issue was published on the newspaper's 31st anniversary, February 19, 2015. The publications continued online as a digital publication, initially under the name Daily Xtra before reverting to the Xtra name.

Contributors
Past contributors to the publications have included Sandra Alland, Richard Burnett, Brenda Cossman, James Dubro, Gerald Hannon, Matthew Hays, Greg Kearney, Todd Klinck, Greg Kramer, R. W. Gray, Raziel Reid, Irshad Manji, Alex Munter, Rachel Giese, Brian Francis, Peter Knegt, and Jeffrey Round.

Other ventures 
Pink Triangle Press also operates squirt.org, an online guide to cruising. The Press sold Cruiseline in March 2011.

See also
List of newspapers in Canada

References

External links
 XtraMagazine.com

Biweekly newspapers published in Canada
Newspapers published in Toronto
LGBT-related newspapers published in Canada
Publications established in 1984
LGBT culture in Toronto
1984 establishments in Ontario
Publications disestablished in 2015
Defunct newspapers published in Ontario
Online newspapers with defunct print editions
LGBT-related magazines published in Canada
1980s LGBT literature
1990s LGBT literature
2000s LGBT literature
2010s LGBT literature
LGBT literature in Canada